Fustius gregerseni is a moth of the family Erebidae first described by Michael Fibiger in 2010. It is known from western Thailand.

The wingspan is about 14.5 mm. The head, patagia, anterior part of the tegulae, prothorax, the basal part of the costa, the triangular patch of the medial area, the small patches of the lower subterminal area and the terminal area, including the fringes are black. The forewing is long and narrow, with a pointed apex. It has a beige ground colour suffused with few light brown scales. The crosslines are untraceable and the terminal line is weakly marked by black interneural dots. The hindwing is beige, with a narrow brown terminal line with an indistinct discal spot. The fringes are beige. The underside of the forewing is grey brown, while the underside of the hindwing is grey, with a discal spot.

References

Micronoctuini
Moths described in 2010
Taxa named by Michael Fibiger